Lại Văn Sâm, born 1957 is a Vietnamese journalist and MC.

Biography
Lại Văn Sâm studied Hinduism for 12 years in Tashkent.

He was host of many television programs, such as Ai là triệu phú? (Who Wants to Be a Millionaire?), Trò chơi thi đấu liên tỉnh, SV '96, SV 2000, Đấu Trí (PokerFace), Đấu trường 100 (1 vs 100), Chiếc nón kỳ diệu (Wheel of Fortune), Hãy chọn giá đúng (The Price Is Right) and Ký ức vui vẻ (Memorable Moments) . He was also one of the founders of VTV3.

On October 5, 2008 he received an award for being the most popular game show host of VTV.

References

External links
 Lại Văn Sâm từng một thời thất nghiệp, VnExpress
 Sự cố của MC Lại Văn Sâm - khoảng lặng vụng về, Tuổi Trẻ
 MC Lại Văn Sâm dịch sai tại liên hoan phim, Vietnamnet

1957 births
People from Phú Thọ province
People from Hanoi
Vietnamese expatriates in the Soviet Union
Vietnamese journalists
Who Wants to Be a Millionaire?
Living people